Héctor Teodoro Polino (14 February 1933 – 18 September 2022) was an Argentine politician. A member of the Democratic Socialist Party and later the Socialist Party, he served in the Argentine Chamber of Deputies from 1993 to 2005.

Polino died in Buenos Aires on 18 September 2022, at the age of 89.

References

1933 births
2022 deaths
20th-century Argentine politicians
21st-century Argentine politicians
Members of the Argentine Chamber of Deputies elected in Buenos Aires
Socialist Party (Argentina) politicians
University of Buenos Aires alumni
Politicians from Buenos Aires